SixSixSix is a box set (included three LPs and a single) released in 2010 by Vinyl on Demand (catalog VOD.79). It chronicled the music of Sleep Chamber from 1979 to 1988, but focused on the first six years of the band. It also included rare Zewizz Kidz tracks, a previously unreleased Sleep Chamber album called Seremony and a booklet. Layout and design were done by Steve Hartman

Track listing
LP1A: Tracks from Ze Wizz Kidz (1979) and Dream Distillate (1983)"
A1 Hell Employee
A2 Waiting
A3 My Uniform
A4 Removing the Surface
A5 The Evil Within
A6 In the Yark
A7 No More
LP1B: Tracks from Musick for Mannequins (1983)
B1 Victmm
B2 Jungle Disease
B3 The Lantern
B4 Left Side of the Tomb
B5 Twenty Three
B6 The Last Fantasy
LP2C: Unreleased material 1984-1985 plus Eden 67 (1985)
C1 Babes of Babylon
C2 Bue Eyes – Blue Sheets
C3 Eden 67
LP2D: Admit to Desire (1985)
D1 Kum Kleaopatra
D2 Subterranean Subhuman 
D3 Submit to Desire
D4 Fetish 
D5 Hailo 
D6 Four Horseman 
LP3E: Unreleased 1982-1987
E1 Just Lust
E2 Rubbermaid
E3 Underwater Room
E4 Fetish Garden
E5 Shaman Ways
LP3F: Unreleased 1982-1987
F1 Tainted Talisman 
F2 Flesh on Flesh 
F3 Queen ov Wands
F4 Opium Den ov Dreams
F5 Cocaine
LP4G: Seremony (1986)
G1 Erotik Apparition 
G2 Stained Prayers
G3 Sabbath 23
LP4H: Seremony (1986br />
H1 Dragons Blood
H2 Fetish Totem
H3 Penance to the Priestess
H4 Backwards Cross
7" Single
A1 Dream Distillate
A2 The Signal
B1 Fight the Power
B2 3 Hands

References
http://www.discogs.com/Sleepchamber-Stolen-Sleep/release/1796478
http://www.discogs.com/Sleep-Chamber-SixSixSix/release/2505247

2010 compilation albums